Vaishali Nagar is an affluent neighbourhood in the southwestern part of Jaipur. It stretches from Queens Road in the east, to Delhi Bypass in the west, and Ajmer Road in the south, to Sirsi Road in the north. Vaishali Nagar's most famous spot is the National Handloom, the spot preferred mostly by local residents to hang out and eat street food.

Amenities
Inox Cinema Hall is in Vaibhav Multiplex at Amrapali Circle. There are about 20 branches of various private and PSU banks. This area has become a satellite area of Jaipur and the residents do not have to go to the main city to fulfill their daily needs. Rather, people from the main city frequently visit this colony for shopping.

The area also has multiple post offices.

Educational institutes

 DAV Centenary Public School
 Tagore Public School
 Brightlands Girls School
 Defence Public School
 Jayshree Periwal High School
 Sanskriti School
 Ravinder Bal Bharti
 Blue Star Public School
 Amar Public Senior Sec School
Sr. Sec. Girls adarsh vidhya mandir

Religion
The area has a Gurdwara on Vaishali Marg; it also is home to Hanuman Vatika in Hanuman Nagar.

Ram Mandir, Ganesh Mandir, Laxminarain Mandir and Jharkhand Shiva Temple are also in this region.

References

Neighbourhoods in Jaipur